Uwe Jens Krafft (born Gustav Heinrich Walter Krafft; 23 December 1878 – 12 December 1929) was a German actor, film director, screenwriter, set designer, and film editor. He directed more than fifteen films from 1917 to 1929.

Selected filmography as director

References

External links 

1878 births
1929 deaths
German male film actors
German film directors
German male screenwriters
German male silent film actors
20th-century German male actors
Mass media people from Kiel